Irina Mataeva is a Russian classical soprano soloist.

Mataeva was born in Tyumen.

Accomplishments
Mariinsky Theatre soloist since 2007

Repertoire
Her previous theatre roles include:
Tatiana (Eugene Onegin)
Sofia (Semyon Kotko)
Louisa (Betrothal in a Monastery)
Natasha Rostova (War and Peace)
Gerda (The Story of Kai and Gerda)
Serpina (La serva padrona)
Lisa (La sonnambula)
Mimì (La bohème)
Lauretta (Gianni Schicchi)
Amore (Orpheé et Euridice in concert)
Barbarina and Susanna (Le nozze di Figaro)
Zerlina (Don Giovanni)
Despina (Così fan tutte)
Klingsor's Flower Maiden (Parsifal)

She has also performed as Prilepa (The Queen of Spades) in Los Angeles and as Micaëla (Carmen) with the Washington Opera under conductor Plácido Domingo.
Mataeva made her debut at the Metropolitan Opera as Tatiana in Eugene Onegin.

External links

Year of birth missing (living people)
Living people
Russian operatic sopranos
People from Tyumen
Saint Petersburg Conservatory alumni
21st-century Russian women opera singers